Mary Cecilia Robinson (22 May 1924 – 3 November 2021) was an English cricketer who played as a right-handed batter. Described in her Daily Telegraph obituary as a "dogged opener", she appeared in 14 Test matches for England between 1949 and 1963, captaining the side in six of those matches. She played domestic cricket for Kent. She was known by her fellow players as "Robbie".

Robinson is the first person born in Canterbury to play Test cricket for England. She scored two Test centuries, both against Australia, one in 1951 and one in 1958. In 2020, Kent County Cricket Club awarded her a county cap, their seventh such award to a female cricketer.

Life outside cricket
Her father, Arthur, was a canon of Canterbury Cathedral. She had two brothers, one of whom - John - became Bishop of Woolwich. She was educated at St Paul's Girls' School in London, where she learnt to play cricket, before going to a physical training college in Bedford. After World War Two, she became a games teacher at St Saviour's and St Olave's Church of England School in London. She had to leave when she decided to accept an invitation to take part in England's tour of Australia in 1948-9, raising money for the sea voyage by working on a poultry farm. The players had to raise about £200 each (then a substantial sum) for their return fare, as well as provide their own spending money.

Subsequently she taught games at Roedean School in Sussex for 32 years, as well as becoming senior house mistress of the junior house. She was also women's golf captain at Tenterden Golf Club in Kent. She never married.

Robinson died on 3 November 2021 in Folkestone, at the age of 97.

Test centuries

See also 
 List of centuries in women's Test cricket

References

External links
 
 

1924 births
2021 deaths
England women Test cricketers
Kent women cricketers
People educated at St Paul's Girls' School
Schoolteachers from Kent
Sportspeople from Canterbury